The 1952 Ball State Cardinals football team was an American football team that represented Ball State Teachers College (later renamed Ball State University) in the Indiana Collegiate Conference (ICC) during the 1952 college football season. In its 17th and final season under head coach John Magnabosco, the team compiled a 3–5–1 record and finished in fourth place out of six teams in the ICC. 

In April 1953, Ball State's long-time coach Magnabasco suffered a heart attack. Three months later, Magnabosco was replaced as head coach. He had been Ball State's head football coach since 1935.

Schedule

References

Ball State
Ball State Cardinals football seasons
Ball State Cardinals football